Proto-Esperanto is the modern term for any of the stages in the evolution of L. L. Zamenhof's language project, prior to the publication of  in 1887.

The  of ca. 1879
The precursors to the Esperanto alphabet can be found in Zamenhof's proposal for the use of Latin script in his Litvish-based unified Yiddish project,  (Neo-Jewish language).
The diacritic, however, is an acute: ć, h́, ś, ź (the last for Esperanto ĵ ). The vowel letters are the same apart from there being no ŭ. Their values are similar to Esperanto in the Litvish reading, with the addition of oŭ, though Poylish reading is divergent. There was in addition a letter ě for the schwa, which only appeared before the consonants l and n and was replaced by e in some circumstances. The circumflex is used, but indicates that a letter is not pronounced: e.g. ês iẑ is pronounced . The following is a sample, with Litvish and Polish readings: 

Novjuda: 
Klejne zah́ěn zet men beser fun-nontěn, greuse – fun-vajtěn. Ous kale, vider mojd. 
Litvish reading: 
Klejne zaĥ(e)n zet men beser fun nont(e)n, grejse – fun vajt(e)n. Oŭs kale, vider mojd. 
Poylish reading: 
Klajne zaĥ(e)n zejt men bejser fin nunt(e)r, groose – fin vat(e)r. Ojs [~ os] kale, vider mod.

The  of 1878
As a child, Zamenhof had the idea to introduce an international auxiliary language for communication between different nationalities. He originally wanted to revive some form of simplified Latin or Greek, but as he grew older he came to believe that it would be better to create a new language for his purpose. During his teenage years he worked on a language project until he thought it was ready for public demonstration. On December 17, 1878 (about one year before the first publication of Volapük), Zamenhof celebrated his 19th birthday and the birth of the language with some friends, who liked the project. Zamenhof himself called his language  (Universal Language).

W is used for v. Otherwise, all modern Esperanto letters are attested apart from those with diacritics (ĉ, ĝ, ĥ, ĵ, ŝ, ŭ). Known verb forms are present -á, imperative -ó, infinitive -are. Nouns were marked by -e in the singular and -es in the plural; the article was singular la and plural las. It appears that there was no accusative case, and that stress was as in modern Esperanto, except when marked, as in -á and -ó.

Only four lines of the  stage of the language from 1878 remain, from an early song that Zamenhof composed:

In modern Esperanto, this would be,

 remains an idiom in modern Esperanto, an allusion to this song.

The  of 1881
While at university, Zamenhof handed his work over to his father, Mordechai, for safe-keeping until he had completed his medical studies. His father, not understanding the ideas of his son and perhaps anticipating problems from the Tsarist police, burned the work. Zamenhof did not discover this until he returned from university in 1881, at which point he restarted his project. A sample from this second phase of the language is this extract of a letter from 1881:

Modern: 
(My dearest friend, never (lit. 'when') would my innocent pen become a tyrant for you. From a hundred of your letters I can conclude that announcements of this kind must wound your brotherly heart; I [can] already see you thus...)

By this time the letter v had replaced w for the [v] sound; verbal inflection for person and number had been dropped; the nominal plural was -oj in place of -es (as well as adjectival -a and adverbial -e); and the noun cases were down to the current two (though a genitive -es survives today in the correlatives). The accusative case suffix was -l, but in many cases was only used on pronouns: 
 'The princess needed to receive this rose and this nightingale'.

In addition to the stronger Slavic flavor of the orthography compared to the modern language (ć, dź, h́, ś, ź for ĉ, ĝ, ĥ, ŝ, ĵ ), the present and past imperfective verb forms still had final stress:
 present tense -è, imperfect -à, preterite -u, future -uj, conditional -as, jussive -ò and infinitive -i.

The pronouns ended in a nominal o (or adjectival a for possessives: mo "I", ma "my"), but there were other differences as well, including a conflation of 'he' and 'it': 

{| class=wikitable
!1881 pronouns||singular||plural
|-
|style="text-align:left;"|1st person||mo||no
|-
|style="text-align:left;"|2nd person||to||vo
|-
|style="text-align:left;"|3rd masc./neut.||ro||rowspan=2|po
|-
|style="text-align:left;"|3rd feminine||śo
|-
|style="text-align:left;"|3rd reflexive||colspan=2|so
|}
In addition, there was indefinite o 'one'.

The correlatives were similarly close, though it is not clear if there was a distinction between indefinite and relative forms (modern i- and ki-; these may have corresponded to kv- and k-) and no possessive forms are known:

{| class="wikitable"
! ||-o||-u||-a||-e||-al||-el||-am||-om
|-
|ti- ||fo ||fu ||fa ||fi ||fej ||fe ||fan|| 
|-
|ki- / i- ||kvo, ko ||kvu, ku ||kva  || || ||kve, ke ||kvan, kan|| kom
|-
|ĉi- ||ćio ||ćiu || ||ćii || || ||ćian || 
|-
|neni- ||fio ||fiu || || || || ||fian || 
|}
The last row was evidently pronounced as fj-. 

Esperanto at this stage had a consonantal ablaut in verbs, with a voiceless consonant for an attempt at something, and a voiced consonant for success. For example,  to listen (for),  to hear;  to look for,  to find;  to argue (a point),  to prove. Traces of this remain in a few pairs of words such as  'to weigh (an item)' and  'to weigh (have weight)' (cf. their derivatives  'scales' &  'a weight').

Transition to the modern Esperanto of 1887
Zamenhof refined his ideas for the language for the next several years. Most of his refinements came through translation of literature and poetry in other languages. The final stress in the verb conjugations was rejected in favour of always stressing the second-last vowel, and the old plural -s on nouns became a marker of finite tenses on verbs, with an imperfect -es remaining until just before publication. The Slavic-style acute diacritics became circumflexes to avoid overt appearances of nationalism, and the new bases of the letters ĵ, ĝ (for former ź, dź) helped preserve the appearance of Romance and Germanic vocabulary.

In a letter to Nikolai Borovko he later wrote,

Later proposals by Zamenhof
By 1894, several proposals to change Esperanto had appeared.
Zamenhof was pressured to incorporate them into Esperanto, and in response presented a reformed Esperanto . The reform was not well received by the community and was declared a failure by Zamenhof.

Further reading
 Gaston Waringhien, in his book  (Language and Life), analyzed the evolution of the language through manuscripts from 1881, 1882, and 1885.

See also
Arcaicam Esperantom – a constructed fictitious 'archaic' version of Esperanto.

References

External links
Christer Kiselman, 2010. . In Esperanto: komenco, aktualo kaj estonteco, UEA. Compares the variants of 1878, 1881, 1887, 1894, and 1906.

Esperanto history
International auxiliary languages